Ankleshwar (sometimes written Ankaleshwar) is a city and a municipality in Bharuch district in the state of Gujarat, India. The city is located 14 kilometres from Bharuch. Ankleshwar Industrial Association (AIA) is the largest organisation of the Gujarat Industrial Development Corporation, where over 2000 industries are registered.

Transport 

Ankleshwar is connected by Indian National Highway 8 (Mumbai to New Delhi) and by the Western Railway Division of Indian Railways. The railway division runs the broad gauge train services to Rajpipla. The 140-year-old (2021) Golden Bridge built in (1881) connects Ankleshwar to Bharuch across the Narmada on the station front while a new bridge connects the highway, the other bridge made by L&T on the highway is now ready to use.

Ankleshwar railway station is centrally located at the intersection of NH8 & Station Road.

Ankleshwar City Bus stand is located on Station Road (i.e. located in the City, the western section).

Development project of Ankleshwar Airport & City Bus are in pipe line in last stage.

Notable people 
Anklesaria, a toponymic surname for Ankleshwar, is found among Parsis from India:

 Saniya Anklesaria, Indian actress
 Shahnaz Aiyar (d. 2015), Indian writer, wife of Swaminathan Aiyar

References 

 
Articles containing potentially dated statements from 2001
All articles containing potentially dated statements
Cities and towns in Bharuch district